Jonathan Barrios (born 20 October 1985) is a Salvadorian professional footballer, who plays as a defender.

Club career

Alianza
In 2004, Barrios signed with Alianza F.C. With Alianza, Barrios reached the Apertura 2012 final, but lost against Isidro Metapán on penalties. Barrios was sent off in that final.

Isidro Metapán
In 2013, Barrios signed with Isidro Metapán. In November 2013, Barrios scored the only goal of the extra match that Alianza and Isidro Metapán played in the Estadio Simeón Magaña, to reach the semi-finals of the Apertura 2013. Both Alianza and Isidro Metapán were tied with 26 points in the league table.

Audaz
Barrios signed with Audaz for the Apertura 2018 tournament.

International goals

International goals
Scores and results list El Salvador's goal tally first.

Honours

Club 
Alianza F.C.
 Primera División
 Champion: Clausura 2011
 Runners-up: Apertura 2010, Apertura 2012

A.D. Isidro Metapán
 Primera División
 Champion: Apertura 2013, Clausura 2014, Apertura 2014
 Runners-up: Clausura 2015

References

1985 births
Living people
A.D. Isidro Metapán footballers
Salvadoran footballers
El Salvador international footballers
Association football defenders